White Lights is the second EP by Deas Vail. It was released on August 26, 2008 under the Brave New World label and the last record released under the indie label. After money issues with B.N.W. Deas Vail had to unsign and their second full-length record Birds and Cages was released under Mono Vs Stereo.

Tracks
 Undercover
 White Lights
 Last Place
 From Priests to Thieves
 Balance
 White Lights (Acoustic) [iTunes Bonus Track]

References

2008 EPs
Deas Vail albums
Albums produced by Mark Lee Townsend